BVM may refer to:

 Blessed Virgin Mary, a title for Mary, mother of Jesus
 Bachelor of Veterinary Medicine, a university degree
 Bag valve mask, a device used in resuscitation procedures to assist patients in breathing
 Birla Vishvakarma Mahavidyalaya, an engineering college in Gujarat, India
 Bohemia Visual Music, an American music video network
 Bolsa de Valores de Montevideo, the main stock exchange in Uruguay
 Sisters of Charity of the Blessed Virgin Mary, a religious order